The 2002 Tashkent Open was a women's tennis tournament played on hard courts at the Tashkent Tennis Center in Tashkent, Uzbekistan that was part of the Tier IV category of the 2002 WTA Tour. It was the fourth edition of the tournament and was held from 10 June through 16 June 2002. First-seeded Marie-Gayanay Mikaelian won the singles title and earned $22,000 first-prize money.

Finals

Singles

 Marie-Gayanay Mikaelian defeated  Tatiana Poutchek, 6–4, 6–4
 It was Mikaelian's only WTA singles title of her career

Doubles

 Tatiana Perebiynis /   Tatiana Poutchek defeated  Mia Buric /  Galina Fokina, 7–5, 6–2

References

External links
 Official website
 ITF tournament edition details
 Tournament draws

Tashkent Open
Tashkent Open
Tashkent Open
Tashkent Open